Danga City Mall, previously known as The Best World, was a shopping mall in Johor Bahru, Johor, Malaysia.

History
The shopping mall was originally opened in 1996 as The Best World but later closed in 1998 due to 1997 Asian financial crisis. After 10 years, it was re-opened as Danga City Mall on 31 August 2008. Later in 2009, it added an expo centre next to the mall to boost the numbers of patrons. However, in July 2018, the mall was closed again for renovation that never started.

Transportation
The shopping mall is accessible by Causeway Link bus route S1. There used to be a KTM Intercity halt here when it was reopened in 2008 but was abandoned and is no longer in use.

See also
 List of shopping malls in Malaysia

References

2008 establishments in Malaysia
Defunct shopping malls in Malaysia
History of Johor
Shopping malls established in 2008